Sameer  is the 2017 Bollywood drama film directed by award-winning documentary maker Dakxin Chhara at his directorial debut. The film premiered at the New York Indian Film Festival (2017). The film stars popular actors like Zeeshan Mohammed Ayyub, Subrat Dutta, Anjali Patil, and Seema Biswas. Produced by Nomad Movies, Sameer had its theatrical release in India on 8 September 2017.

Plot 
After a series of bomb blasts in Hyderabad a special ATS team, led by officer Desai, identified Yasin Darji as the suspect. Following a tip, the team reaches a location to arrest Yasin only to end up arresting Sameer, the wrong guy. While the error needs to be fixed, the higher authorities decide to bargain with Sameer for his freedom, sending him as a mole. Sameer turns a mole to stop Yasin Darji before he kills more innocent people. A chase begins. Will they manage to stop Yasin, or will Yasin triumph?

Cast 
 Mohammed Zeeshan Ayyub as Sameer Sengupta
 Subrat Dutta as Desai, ATS Dy. Chief
 Anjali Patil as Alia Irade
 Chinmay Mandlekar as Shaheed
 Seema Biswas as Mumtaz Khala
 Manoj Shah as Bahubali Mehta
 Alok Gagdekar as Manto
 Master Shubham Bajrange as Rocket

Film Festivals and Awards

Sameer had its World Premiere at the 17th New York Indian Film Festival on 6 May 2017. The film was also screened at Charlotte Asian Film Festival 2017.

Controversy 

Sameer made into the headlines when India's Central Board of Film Certification ordered the director to remove the words "Mann ki baat", from a dialogue as it is the name of the radio show hosted by Prime Minister Narendra Modi.

Soundtrack

The soundtrack of Sameer consists of 3 songs composed by Vipin Heero and Pankaj Awasthi while the lyrics have been written by Piyush Mishra and Vipin Heero.

Critical reception

Sweta Kausal of Hindustan Times gave the film a rating of 3.5 out of 5 and praised the performance of Mohammed Zeeshan Ayyub saying that, "While all the actors seamlessly fit their characters, Zeeshan once again proves his mettle as he goes from a vulnerable man to a becoming a puppet and later a master negotiator.". About the film the critic said that, "It is the well-knit screenplay and crisp editing that maintains the pace and makes Sameer an edge-of-the-seat thriller with a few melodramatic dialogues thrown in." Reza Noorani of The Times of India gave the film a rating of 3 out of 5 and said that, "Sameer is a proper edge-of-the-seat thriller, albeit with its flaws, but keeps you hooked till the very end with a very strong pay-off." Shubhra Gupta of The Indian Express praised the performance of Mohammed Zeeshan Ayyub but also added that, "the rest of it is thin and predictable" and gave the film a rating of 1.5 out of 5. Business Standard gave the film a rating of 3 out of 5 and said that, "For all its glaring sins of excesses and hysteria "Sameer" dares to go into a political theme that spells trouble for the perpetrator. For this, the film needs to be commended." Vishal Verma of Glamsham gave the film a rating of 3 out of 5 and said that, "Despite having its flaws and its overwhelming reluctance to take any sides, SAMEER still manages to be a tight, edge of the seat surprise in the end and that's the movie's biggest victory."

References

External links
 
 

Indian drama films
2017 films
2010s Hindi-language films
2017 directorial debut films
2017 drama films
Hindi-language drama films